Holoxanthina is a genus of moths of the family Erebidae. The genus was erected by George Hampson in 1926.

Species
Holoxanthina lutosa (Karsch, 1895) Togo
Holoxanthina rhodotela (Viette, 1958) Madagascar

References

Calpinae